Alfonso Bonzo is a 1986 children's book by Andrew Davies and a 1990 children's short-lived television series adapted from the book by the author. The series starred Alex Jennings as Alfonso Bonzo and Scott Riley as Billy Webb.

Billy Webb is a young boy who likes to swap things with his school mates. He meets Alfonso Bonzo, an "Italian exchange student" who also has a talent for swapping things (thus his self-description: he is an Italian student who exchanges things). Alfonso offers Billy a variety of temporary swaps to demonstrate his abilities: Billy's boring old dog for a greyhound that does ballet, the wonky Webb family television for a new model with a button that lets the viewer become part of the action, Billy's battered schoolbag full of unfinished homework for a brand new schoolbag containing a file folder that magically produces finished homework, but, each swap has disadvantages as well as advantages, and Alfonso Bonzo cuts an increasingly sinister figure as he leads up to one last swap, this one for keeps.

The TV series later had a spinoff called Billy Webb's Amazing Stories, featuring Billy's further (non-Alfonso-related) adventures.

Cast

Scott Riley as Billy Webb
Alex Jennings as Alfonso Bonzo
Mike Walling as Trevor Trotman
Susan Porrett as Mrs. Webb
Fleur Taylor as Linda Webb
Gil Brailey as Mrs. Peasgood
Brian Hall as Mr. Webb

External links

BFI Film & TV Database entry

1986 British novels
1990 British television series debuts
1991 British television series endings
1990s British children's television series
British children's novels
BBC children's television shows
1990s British television miniseries
English-language television shows
British television shows based on children's books
Fictional Italian people in literature
1986 children's books
British children's books
Methuen Publishing books